Carl Johan Hartman (14 April 1790 in Gävle – 28 August 1849 in Stockholm) was a Swedish physician and botanist.

Works 
 Handbok i Skandinaviens flora, 1820, 11. Auflage 1879 (spätere Auflagen von seinem Sohn herausgegeben)
 Utkast till botanologien, 1843
 Svensk och norsk excusionsflora, 1846
 Utkast till populär naturkunnighet 1836
 Husläkaren, 1828, 6. Auflage herausgegeben von O. F. Hallin 1872

References

External links 
 

19th-century Swedish botanists
1790 births
1849 deaths